The 1918 Centre Colonels football team represented Centre College in the 1918 college football season. The season started late due to flu epidemic. The game on November 16 with University of Kentucky was cancelled for the same reason.

Schedule

Players

Line

Backfield

Subs

Unlisted

Coaching staff
 Head coach: Charley Moran
 Assistant coach: Robert L. Myers

References

Centre
Centre Colonels football seasons
Centre Colonels football